The 1978 NFL draft was the procedure by which National Football League teams selected amateur college football players. It is officially known as the NFL Annual Player Selection Meeting. The draft was held May 2–3, 1978, at the Roosevelt Hotel in New York City, New York. The league also held a supplemental draft after the regular draft and before the regular season.

The Tampa Bay Buccaneers had the first overall pick in the 1978 draft, by virtue of their 2–12 record in 1977. Tampa Bay traded the pick to the Oilers, for tight end Jimmie Giles and the Oilers' first- and second-round picks in the 1978 draft, and their third- and fifth-round picks in 1979.

Leon White, who was drafted in the third round, went on to have an extensive professional wrestling career as Big Van Vader.

Player selections

Round one

Round two

Round three

Round four

Round five

Round six

Round seven

Round eight

Round nine

Round ten

Round eleven

Round twelve

Notable undrafted players

Hall of Famers
 Earl Campbell, running back from Texas, taken 1st round 1st overall by Houston Oilers
Inducted: Professional Football Hall of Fame class of 1991.
 Ozzie Newsome, wide receiver from Alabama, taken 1st round 23rd overall by Cleveland Browns
Inducted: Professional Football Hall of Fame class of 1999.
 James Lofton, wide receiver from Stanford, taken 1st round 6th overall by Green Bay Packers
Inducted: Professional Football Hall of Fame class of 2003.
 Warren Moon, quarterback from Washington, signed undrafted by Houston Oilers
Inducted: Professional Football Hall of Fame class of 2006.

References

External links
 NFL.com – 1978 Draft
 databaseFootball.com – 1978 Draft
 Pro Football Hall of Fame

National Football League Draft
NFL Draft
Draft
NFL draft
NFL Draft
American football in New York City
1970s in Manhattan
Sporting events in New York City
Sports in Manhattan